Crawfish Creek may refer to:

Crawfish Creek (Chickamauga Creek tributary), a stream in Georgia
Crawfish Creek (Wyoming)

See also
Crayfish Creek